Viqarunnisa comes from pasting the words "Viqar un Nisa", and may refer to:

 Viqarunnisa Noon School
 Viqarunnisa Noon College
 Viqarunnisa University
 Viqar un Nisa College for Women Rawalpindi
 Viqar un Nisa Noon, the wife of the 7th Prime Minister of Pakistan, Feroz Khan Noon